GAL (Borger 2003 nr. 553; U+120F2 𒃲) is the Sumerian cuneiform for "great".

See also

LÚ.GAL (King, i.e. Man–Great)
DEREŠ.KI.GAL

References

Sumerian words and phrases
Cuneiform determinatives
Cuneiform signs